The National Shellfish Sanitation Program (NSSP) is a program under which the federal Food and Drug Administration works cooperatively with the states, the Interstate Shellfish Sanitation Conference, and industry to assure the safety of molluscan shellfish (clams, oysters, mussels). Among other things, all such products entering interstate commerce must be handled by state-certified dealers, be properly tagged, be tracked by appropriate records, and be processed in plants that meet sanitation requirements. The FDA continually reviews state shellfish control programs for their effectiveness.

See also
 Depuration
 Interstate Shellfish Sanitation Conference

External links
 Website

United States Department of Agriculture